Pizza Inn is a Dallas-based restaurant chain and international food franchise, specializing in American-style pan pizza, pasta, and side dishes.

The company is based in the Dallas suburb of The Colony, Texas. At its peak, Pizza Inn had over 500 locations in 20 states. As of June 28, 2020, Pizza Inn had 252 stores within the United States, located primarily in towns within the Southern United States, and 38 stores internationally.

History
In 1958, two Texas brothers, F.J. (Joe) and R. L. Spillman, opened the first Pizza Inn in Dallas.

In the mid-1980s, the restaurant chain had a commercial deal with the Von Erich family, with Kerry Von Erich, Kevin Von Erich, and Mike Von Erich appearing in a series of televised commercials. 

In June 2011, Pizza Inn launched the fast casual restaurant Pie Five Pizza, which specializes in customizable pizzas that are made within five minutes, in Fort Worth, Texas. They had five locations within the Fort Worth area by the end of the year. As of January 2015, they had 31 locations.

In October 2011, Pizza Inn opened their first of five planned Chinese locations in Hangzhou, China.

Former PepsiCo and Yum! Brands executive Randy Gier joined the company in 2012. He served as CEO until 2016.

On January 9, 2015, the parent company Pizza Inn Holdings (ticker symbol: "PZZI") was rebranded as a portfolio company named Rave Restaurant Group (ticker symbol: "RAVE") as Pie Five Pizza locations began to increase.

In May 2018, Rave Restaurant Group opened its first PIE by Pizza Inn Express pizza kiosks with Delaware North at the Fort Lauderdale–Hollywood International Airport.

On February 5, 2021, Pizza Inn reported improving sales amid hectic environment during the COVID-19 pandemic. In the period ending December 27, domestic same-store sales decreased from $18.95 million to $15.46 million, or 18.4 percent for the company, which is the chain's best performing quarter since the pandemic began. Pizza Inn also saw comparative sales drop 39 percent in the quarter ending June 28 and 22 percent in the quarter ending September 27.

See also
 List of pizza chains of the United States

References

External links 
 RAVE Restaurant Group
 Pizza Inn, USA
 Pizza Inn, Kuwait
 Pizza Inn, Saudi Arabia 
 
 Pizza Inn, Australia

Companies that filed for Chapter 11 bankruptcy in 1989
Pizza chains of the United States
Restaurant chains in the United States
Companies based in the Dallas–Fort Worth metroplex
Denton County, Texas
Restaurants established in 1958
Companies listed on the Nasdaq
Pizza franchises
1958 establishments in Texas